Clackamas Education Service District is an  education service district that coordinates school events and activities throughout the school districts in Clackamas County, Oregon. Clackamas ESD serves the educational needs of students and families in Clackamas County – a geographic area of 1,879 square miles.

Clackamas ESD is governed by a citizen-elected Board of Directors and an appointed advisor representing employment training. Five of the Board positions represent geographical zones and two are designated at-large. All members serve four-year terms.

Administration
The superintendent is Jada Rupley, who has been serving since 2016. An assistant superintendent, four service area directors and an executive assistant provide support.

Districts
CESD serves the following School districts:

 Canby School District
 Colton School District
 Estacada School District
 Gladstone School District
 Molalla River School District
 Lake Oswego School District
 North Clackamas School District
 Oregon City School District
 Oregon Trail School District
 West Linn-Wilsonville School District

See also

 List of school districts in Oregon

References

External links
 

Education in Clackamas County, Oregon
School districts in Oregon
Local government in Oregon